Yemen competed at the 1996 Summer Olympics in Atlanta, United States.

Athletics

Track & road events

Wrestling

Greco-Roman

References
Official Olympic Reports

Nations at the 1996 Summer Olympics
1996
Oly